Konanur or Paduvalamarahalli is a village in Nanjangud taluk of Mysore district, Karnataka state, India.

Location
Konanur is located about 15 km from the nearest town of Chamarajanagar.  Nanjangud town is also nearby.

Demographics
There are 1,924 people in the village living in 482 houses.  The total area of the village is 705 hectares.

Landmarks
The village has a panchayath office, one government school and two private schools.  There are many temples around the lake in the village.

Transportation
The village has a railways station called Konanur railway station.  It comes in the Mysore-Chamarajnagar branchline. There are three trains every day to Mysore and Chamarajanagar on either sides.

See also
Nanjangud Town
Chinnada Gudi Hundi
Narasam Budhi
Kavalande
Badana Guppe
Mariyala-Gangavadi Halt
Chamarajanagar
Mukkadahalli

Image gallery

References

Villages in Mysore district